The  (nicknamed KANDOK) was a professional baseball league in Japan which operated from –. The league made history on March 26, 2009, when pitcher Eri Yoshida made her debut as the first female in an otherwise all-male league.

History 
The league's activities became public in 2008. Plans to form the league were announced at a press conference on March 6, 2008. On July 30, 2008, the names of the four teams were released: 
 Osaka Gold Villicanes
 Kobe 9 Cruise
 Harima (later changed to Akashi Red Soldiers)
 Wakayama (later changed to Kishu Rangers)

The league held its first draft on November 16, 2008. The Kobe 9 Cruise made history, selecting 16-year-old Eri Yoshida to be the first female in an otherwise all-male league. Yoshida made her professional debut at the Osaka Dome in the opening game of the KIBL on March 26, 2009, before 11,592 fans. Yoshida faced two batters, walking the first and striking-out the second in a 5-0 win over the Osaka Gold Villicanes.

The first league champion, the Osaka Gold Villicanes, left KANDOK after the first season, seceding to the Japan Future Baseball League. A new team, Seoul Haechi, was created to fill their spot.

Following the model of the Osaka Gold Villicanes, the second league champion, the Kobe 9 Cruise, seceded from KANDOK after the 2010 season, while the Akashi Red Soldiers went defunct. The league added three new teams, the Hyogo Blue Sandars, the Kobe Suns, and the Osaka Hawks Dream. The league now had five teams.

The Osaka Hawks Dream seceded after the 2011 season and Seoul Haechi went defunct, reducing the league to three teams. To fill the void, the Yamato Samurai Reds and the 06BULLS were created in time for the 2012 season.

The Kobe Suns and Yamato Samurai Reds both went defunct after the 2012 season.

In its final season the league had three teams, the Kishu Rangers, the Hyogo Blue Sandars, and the 06BULLS, with the Rangers being the only team which lasted for the duration of the league.

Teams

Championship history

References

This article incorporates information translated from 関西独立リーグ (Kansai Dokuritsu League) in the Japanese Wikipedia, retrieved on November 17, 2008.

Independent baseball leagues
Defunct baseball leagues in Japan
Sports leagues established in 2009
2009 establishments in Japan